Barefoot is both a surname and a given name. Notable people with the name include:

Surname:
 Chad Barefoot (born 1983), American politician from North Carolina
 Napoleon Barefoot (born 1930), Superior Court Judge North Carolina
 Herbert Barefoot (1887–1958), English military officer and architect
 John Barefoot, British stamp dealer, publisher of the Barefoot Catalogue
 Ken Barefoot (born 1945), American football tight end
 Magnus Barefoot (1073–1103), King of Norway
 Robert Barefoot (born 1944), Canadian alternative health doctor
 William Barefoot (1872–1941), British politician 

Given name:
 Barefoot Sanders (1925–2008), American District Judge from Texas